Mount Rose is the highest mountain in Washoe County, within the Carson Range of Nevada, United States.  It ranks thirty-seventh among the most topographically prominent peaks in the state. It is also both the highest and most topographically prominent peak of the greater Sierra Nevada range within the state of Nevada, and the third most topographically prominent peak in the Sierra Nevada overall. It is located in the Mount Rose Wilderness of the Humboldt-Toiyabe National Forest. An extinct volcano, the mountain is in between Lake Tahoe and Reno. State Route 431 traverses Mount Rose Summit southeast of Mount Rose. Due to the high elevation, most of the precipitation that falls on the mountain is snow.  The view from Mount Rose, facing east is the Truckee Meadows area is the second largest population center in Nevada.

According to one tradition, the peak was named after Jacob S, Rose, an early settler, while another tradition states the mountain has the name of Rose Hickman, an early explorer.

Mount Rose Ski Tahoe is nearby but is not on Mount Rose. Despite the name, the resort is actually on the slopes of Slide Mountain, which is on the other side of Nevada State Route 431.  The east slope of Slide Mountain, is the East Bowl of Mt. Rose.  In 1964, the north side of Slide Mountain was named Mount Rose Ski Area and Reno Ski Bowl was renamed Slide Mountain Ski Area. In 1987 the two ski areas merged and began operation as one resort named Mt. Rose.

Dr. James Edward Church of the University of Nevada established the Mount Rose Weather Observatory, one of America's first high-altitude meteorological observatories, on June 29, 1905.

Summit panorama

Climate

Being a three-thousander and a mountain at a considerably high latitude, Mount Rose has an alpine climate with humid continental characteristics (Köppen: Dfb). On average, the summit experiences four months with lukewarm temperatures (that being its summer from June–September) while the remainder of the year remains cold and chilly with frequent subzero temperatures. In contrast to the rest of Nevada, Mount Rose is plentiful in precipitation, and thus stands out from the state's predominantly hot semi-arid/desert climate.

See also
 List of highest points in Nevada by county
 Slide Mountain

References

External links

 
 
  The first instrument for measuring snow water content. It is still in use today.

Mountains of Washoe County, Nevada
Mountains of Nevada
Humboldt–Toiyabe National Forest